Dictionary of the Khazars: A Lexicon Novel is the first novel by Serbian writer Milorad Pavić, published in 1984. Originally written in Serbian, the novel has been translated into many languages. It was first published in English by Knopf, New York in 1988.

There is no easily discerned plot in the conventional sense, but the central question of the book (the mass religious conversion of the Khazar people) is based on a historical event generally dated to the last decades of the 8th century or the early 9th century when the Khazar royalty and nobility converted to Judaism, and part of the general population followed. There are more or less three different significant time-periods that take place in the novel. The first period takes place between the 7th and 11th centuries and is mainly composed of the stories of the polemic, its representatives and the Khazars themselves. The second period takes place during the 17th century, and includes stories about the lives of the compilers of the in-universe Khazar Dictionary and their contemporaries. The third briefly takes place in the 1960s and 70s, but mostly in the 1980s, and includes stories of academics of areas that are in some way to do with the Khazars. There are also mentions of things that happened outside of these periods, such as the talk of primordial beings like Adam Ruhani and Adam Cadmon.

Most of the characters and events described in the novel are entirely fictional, as is the culture ascribed to the Khazars in the book, which bears little resemblance to any literary or archeological evidence.

The novel takes the form of three cross-referenced mini-encyclopedias, sometimes contradicting each other, each compiled from the sources of one of the major Abrahamic religions (Christianity, Islam, and Judaism). In his introduction to the work, Pavić wrote:

The book comes in two different editions, one "male" and one "female", which differ in only a critical passage in a single paragraph.

Pavić stated that the Khazars were a metaphor for a small people surviving in between great powers and great religions. In Yugoslavia, Serbs recognized their own fate; it was the same in Slovenia and elsewhere, a schoolbook on survival. The same in Hungary and Czechoslovakia, and on and on. A French critic said, 'We are all Khazars in the age of nuclear threat and poisoned environment.'

A ballet adaption of the Dictionary of the Khazars was staged at Madlenianum Opera and Theatre.

Characters

Characters from the 7th to 11th Century
Princess Ateh – Princess of the Khazar Kaghanate who gets punished with immortality and sexlessness. In the 1980s, it is revealed that she remained with the name Virginia Ateh.
Mokaddasa Al-Safer – A priest in the Green book and a rabbi in the Yellow. He is a Dream Hunter with whom Ateh has an affair, causing him to be punished by the Kaghan by being hung in an iron cage above a river. 
Ibn (Abu) Haderash – A demon of the Islamic hell who, in the Yellow book, punished Ateh for helping the Hebrew representative of the Khazar polemic out-argue the other two representatives.
Sabriel – The name of the Kaghan who staged the polemic in the Yellow book.
Kaghan -  The ruler of Khazar, assembled limbs into a second Kaghan from surviving cripples, the younger one as his heir, who was sent to Princess Ateh and then fell down dead finally in the Red book.

Characters from the 17th Century
Avram Brankovich – A Constantinople diplomat and compiler of the Christian part of the in-universe Khazar Dictionary.
Yusuf Masudi – An Anatolian Dream Hunter and compiler of the Islamic part of the Khazar Dictionary.
Samuel Cohen – A Croatian Jew and compiler of the Judaic part of the Khazar Dictionary.
Nikon Sevast – The first name mentioned to have been used by Satan during his time on Earth. He was a calligrapher and accompanied Brankovich and Masudi on their journeys.
Skila Averkie – A fencing instructor with whom Brankovich practiced his saber skills.
Petkutin Brankovich – Avram Brankovich's youngest son, artificially made out of mud as an experiment to see if the dead can be tricked into thinking that someone like Petkutin could be a real human.
Kalina – Petkutin's lover and wife. She was killed and eaten by the dead inhabitants of a Roman theatre ruin, and then killed and ate Petkutin herself. 
Yabir Ibn Akshany – The second name mentioned to have been used by Satan, after Turkish soldiers "slashed Nikon Sevast to pieces."

Characters from the 20th Century
Mr. Van der Spaak – The third name mentioned to have been used by Satan, after, as Yabir Ibn Akshany in the 17th century, he dipped his head into a pail of water, and pulled it out of a sink in a hotel in 1982.
Dr. Isailo Suk – A Serbian archeologist and Arabist who gets smothered by a pillow to death by Mr. Spaak.
Dr. Abu Kabir Muawia – A professor and Hebraist. He fought in the Israeli-Egyptian war.
Dr. Dorothea Schultz – A professor and Slavist. She was sentenced to six years imprisonment for the false-confession of killing Dr. Suk, after being blamed for the killing of Dr. Muawia, who she intended to kill, but didn't, as he provided to her an important academic discovery.
Manuil Van der Spaak – Mr. Spaak's 4-year-old son. He shot and killed Mr. Muawia with Dr. Schultz's pistol, according to Ateh's testimony in Dr. Muawia's murder case.
The Hungarian – A harpsichordist and keeper of the shop in which Dr. Suk bought a cello for his niece.

See also

Khazars in fiction
Kuzari
 Han Shaogong's A Dictionary of Maqiao

References

External links
Dictionary of the Khazars: a novel by Milorad Pavic, excerpts from "Postmodernism as Nightmare: Milorad Pavic's Literary Demolition of Yugoslavia" by Andrew Wachtel

1984 novels
False documents
Metafictional novels
Postmodern novels
Secret histories
Serbian novels
Khazars
Nonlinear narrative novels
Fictional encyclopedias